Heywood is a surname. Notable people with the surname include:

 Abel Heywood (1810–1893), English politician
 Angela Heywood (1840–1935), United States suffragist, socialist, abolitionist
 Anne Heywood (born 1932), British film actress
 Arthur Heywood (1849–1916), 3rd Baronet, experimental railway builder
 Arthur Heywood-Lonsdale (1835–1897), English rower and Canadian landowner
 Benjamin Heywood (1793–1865), 1st of the Heywood Baronets, English banker and philanthropist
 Bernard Heywood (1871–1960), English bishop
 Charles Heywood (1803–1853), a Lieutenant in the U. S. Navy, who had distinguished himself in the Mexican–American War and father of Charles Heywood (1839–1915).
 Charles Heywood (1839–1915), United States general
 Charles D. Heywood (1881–1957), minor United States businessman
 Doug Heywood (1924–2002), Australian rules footballer
 Eddie Heywood (1915–1989), United States jazz musician
 Ezra Heywood (1829–1893), United States radical
 Frances Heywood (1902 – 1994) British metallurgist and engineer
 George Heywood (1907–1985), English footballer
 Herbert Heywood (born 1913), English footballer
 Hugh Heywood (1896–1987), Anglican priest
 Jamie Heywood (born 1966), United States engineer, and director of ALS Therapy Development Foundation
 James Heywood (philanthropist) (1810–1897), British politician
 Jasper Heywood (1535–1598), English scholar and translator
 Jean Heywood (1921–2019), British actress
 Jeff Heywood (born 1951), United States racing driver
 Jeremy Heywood (1961–2018), British civil servant
 Joanne Heywood, British actress
 John Heywood, 16th century English writer
 John B. Heywood (photographer), 19th century United States photographer
John B. Heywood, Engineer, Professor
 John D. Heywood, 19th century United States photographer
 Joseph L. Heywood (1815–1910), bishop in the Church of Jesus Christ of Latter-day Saints
 Joseph Lee Heywood (1837–1876), victim of bank robbery
 Matthew Heywood (born 1979), English footballer
 Neil Heywood (1970–2011), British businessman murdered in China
 Oliver Heywood (1825–1892), English banker and philanthropist
 Oliver Heywood (minister) (1630–1702), English nonconformist minister
 Pat Heywood (born 1927), British actress
 Paul Heywood, British academic
 Peter Heywood (1772–1831), British naval officer
 Phil Heywood, United States musician
 Ralph Heywood (1921–2007), American football player and marine
 Richard Heywood (bishop) (1867–1955), Anglican Bishop
 Richard Heywood (MP) (by 1520 – 1570)
 Samuel Heywood (Berkeley) (1833–1903), minor United States businessman
 Samuel Heywood (chief justice) (1753–1828), British lawyer
 Stephen Heywood (1969–2006), United States architect and ALS campaigner
 Suzanne Heywood (born 1969), British business executive
 Thomas Heywood (died 1641), English actor and playwright
 Thomas Heywood (railway engineer) (died 1953) British locomotive engineer
 Thomas Percival Heywood (1823–1897), 2nd Baronet
 Thomas Heywood (antiquarian) (1797–1866), English member of the Chetham Society 
 Thomas Heywood (organist) (born 1974)
 Tim Heywood (1914–2006), British soldier and farmer
 Vernon Heywood (born 1927), British botanist

English-language surnames